The 2003 World Horticultural Exposition (in German: Internationale Gartenschau 2003) was organized in the City of Rostock in Germany. It was the 17th international horticultural exposition which was recognized by the Bureau International des Expositions. The park was created in a derelict area around ruins of the former village of Schmarl, on the banks of the river Warnow. This made it possible to have a connection between water and gardens.

The project IGA 2003 
The project was more than the World Horticultural Exposition. The access roads to the newly built Warnow Tunnel, the new trade fair and congress centre, the integration of the historical ship type Frieden as a wharf museum, the reuse of the park after the exhibition and the improvement of infrastructure in Rostock were part of the project as well.

Participating countries 

Thirty-two countries were represented with a national garden: Austria, Bolivia, Bulgaria, China, Colombia, Croatia, Finland, France, Greece, Germany, Hungary, India, Indonesia, Italy, Japan, Kenya, Latvia, Luxembourg, Mauritania, Netherlands, North Korea, Pakistan, Poland, Slovakia, Spain, South Africa, South Korea, Switzerland, Tanzania, Tunisia, United Arab Emirates, and Vietnam.

Financials 
The preparation and furnishing of the terrain cost 62 million euros, the trade fair 32 million euros. The bills were paid by the City of Rostock, the State Mecklenburg-Vorpommern and the German federal government. 2.63 million people visited the exposition. The IGA 2003 met expectations as an attraction for holiday makers and tourists. More than half of the visitors came from outside Mecklenburg-Vorpommern and one third stayed in Rostock overnight, resulting in 50 million euros extra sales in this region. Despite this result the exposition closed with a deficit of 20 million euros due to lack of supervision by the authorities.

Events 

During the IGA 2003, a total of 17,000 visitors attended 275 different meetings and congresses. 32 countries were represented with their own national gardens, and 20 of them got extra attention on the  Nationentage. Visitors liked the national gardens, the aerial cable car, the floating garden, and the 25 alternating displays in the trade fair.

Several outdoor events, totalling 1361 on 171 days, were held in the park. The main contributors were the Rostocker Volkstheater with 50 events, and the broadcaster NDR with their Open-Air-Veranstaltungen.

Willow Church 

An architectural experiment was the Willow Church constructed during the preparations for the IGA 2003. It was the biggest living building of the world. The dome was 15 meters high and the church was 52 meters long. The building was designed by architect Marcel Kalberer, who also led the construction. 650 volunteers from 13 countries started building in 2001. 50 volunteers at the same time lived at a camp to knot and bundle the willow branches and set up the self-supporting construction. During the IGA an average of 300 visitors attended the mass on Sundays. 250 services took place, 3 of them marriages and 6 baptisms.

Reuse 

All park facilities and a part of the national gardens were retained and can still be visited. Access to the park however is restricted by a fence, its location outside the city and the entrance fares. The stage in the park and the Willow Church are still in use. The trade fair appears to be a financial burden for the city that still has to pay for the losses.

References

External links 
 IGA-Park
 Weidendom
 Official website of the BIE

World's fairs in Germany
International horticultural exhibitions
2003 in Germany